The Borel Torpille (French: "Torpedo") was a French single-engine single-seat aircraft built in 1913.

Design and development
The Torpille had a wire-braced monoplane wing attached to a monocoque fuselage.  The streamlined fuselage was the basis for the plane's appellation.  Its powerplant was a  rotary engine.

Operational history
Pierre Daucourt used the Torpille to compete in the 1913 Coupe Pommery.  He flew it in the first leg of the 1913 competition, and later used it in an attempt to reach Egypt by air.

Specifications

References
 
 
 Contemporary diagram published in l'Aérophile, date unknown

External links
 Pictures of the Borel Torpille

See also

1910s French sport aircraft
Racing aircraft
Mid-engined aircraft
Single-engined pusher aircraft
Rotary-engined aircraft
Torpille
Aircraft first flown in 1913